The 2008 Tour de Suisse was the 72nd edition of the Tour de Suisse road cycling stage race. The race took place from 14 June to 22 June 2008 and is part of the 2008 UCI ProTour. It began in Langnau im Emmental and ended in Bern. The race was won by Roman Kreuziger.

Teams
Twenty teams of eight riders started the race:

Route

Stages

Stage 1
14 June 2008 - Langnau I.E. to Langnau I.E.,

Stage 2
15 June 2008 - Langnau I.E. to Flumserberg,

Stage 3
16 June 2008 - Flums to Gossau SG,

Stage 4
17 June 2008 - Gossau SG to Domat/Ems,

Stage 5
18 June 2008 - Domat/Ems to Caslano,

Stage 6
19 June 2008 - Ambrì to Verbier,

Stage 7
20 June 2008 - Gruyères to Lyss,

Stage 8
21 June 2008 - Altdorf to Klausen Pass,  (ITT)

Stage 9
22 June, 2008 - Altdorf to Berne,

Classification leadership

 In stage 2, Martin Elmiger wore the green jersey.
 In stage 3, Martin Elmiger wore the white jersey.

See also
2008 in road cycling

References

Further reading

External links

 
 cyclingnews.com

Tour de Suisse
2008 UCI ProTour
2008